William George Mackey Davis (May 9, 1812 – March 11, 1898) was a Confederate States Army brigadier general and blockade runner during the American Civil War. He was a lawyer and cotton speculator before the war and a lawyer in Washington, D.C. after the war.

Early life
William George Mackey Davis was born on May 9, 1812 in Portsmouth, Virginia. At age 17, he became a sailor. Later he lived in Alabama and then moved to Apalachicola, Florida where he became a lawyer and cotton speculator.

American Civil War
When the American Civil War started, Davis donated $50,000 to the Confederate States and raised the  1st Florida Cavalry Regiment for the Confederate States Army. He was elected colonel and given command of the Confederate provisional forces in eastern Florida. On March 25, 1862, he was sent to join General Albert Sidney Johnston in Tennessee. There, he commanded the 2d brigade in the 2d division (Heth's) from about July 3, 1862 to October 31, 1862, then the 1st brigade of the 3rd division (Heth's) of the Department of East Tennessee until December 1862. During the later period, on November 6, 1862, he was promoted to brigadier general. He commanded the 1st brigade of the District, Department of East Tennessee from December 1862 to early 1863. He then served as commander of the Department of East Tennessee until he resigned his commission on May 6, 1863.

Soon after his resignation from the Confederate States army, Davis lived in Richmond, Virginia and Wilmington, North Carolina where he ran a fleet of blockade runners between Wilmington and Nassau.

Aftermath
After a brief period of residence in Jacksonville, Florida after the war, Davis was pardoned on June 9, 1866. He then moved to Washington, D.C. and resumed the practice of law.

Davis died at Alexandria, Virginia, March 11, 1898. He is buried in Tacket-Burroughs-Davis Cemetery, Remington, Virginia.

See also
 List of American Civil War generals (Confederate)

Notes

References
Boatner, Mark Mayo, III. The Civil War Dictionary. New York: McKay, 1988. . First published New York, McKay, 1959.
Eicher, John H., and David J. Eicher. Civil War High Commands. Stanford, CA: Stanford University Press, 2001. .
Sifakis, Stewart. Who Was Who in the Civil War. New York: Facts On File, 1988. .
Warner, Ezra J. Generals in Gray: Lives of the Confederate Commanders. Baton Rouge: Louisiana State University Press, 1959. .

External links

Confederate States Army generals
People of Virginia in the American Civil War
1812 births
1898 deaths
People from Portsmouth, Virginia